Brian McGee (born 8 March 1959) is a Scottish drummer who played in different bands like Simple Minds and Endgames. His brother Owen, under the name Owen Paul, had a hit single with a cover of Marshall Crenshaw's "You're My Favorite Waste of Time".

McGee met future Simple Minds frontman Jim Kerr at Holyrood R.C. Secondary School, and joined him and other friends (guitarist Charlie Burchill and bassist Tony Donald) from the same school in the band Biba-Rom! around the mid-1970s, while still at school. In 1977, they formed the punk band Johnny and the Self Abusers, whose name changed to Simple Minds. He was present on the albums Life in a Day, Real to Real Cacophony, Empires and Dance and Sons and Fascination. In September 1981, he left Simple Minds after having tired of constant touring and life with the band.

After working in his parents' pub, he joined Endgames, replacing David Wilde who left to tour with another Glasgow based band, Altered Images. After two albums, the band dissolved in 1985. By that time, he, along with former Simple Minds bandmate Derek Forbes, joined Propaganda, remaining until 1995. In 2009, they both formed the band Ex-Simple Minds. Married to Alison McGee and step-father to Louise.

References

External links
 Brian McGee at Simple Minds.org
 Discogs: Brian McGee
 Website Ex Simple Minds

1959 births
Scottish drummers
British male drummers
Scottish new wave musicians
Simple Minds members
People from Gorbals
Living people